Michael T. Franklin (born April 16, 1952) is an American musician and record producer.

Biography

Early career
Michael Thomas Franklin was born in Buffalo, New York, United States. As a producer, keyboard player and vocalist, he began his career performing in a local Buffalo band called The Movement. The group had a regional hit in 1966 with "Left Silently". In 1969 his family relocated to Chesterton, Indiana, where he performed with several local groups, including GUM, Polyphemus and Rafter After.

In 1974 Franklin started his first recording studio Futuresound, in Beverly Shores, Indiana, where he would record and produce Danny & the Juniors, Eldee Young, Lou Christie, and The Drifters, among others, leading to a 1982 Grammy nomination for best recording of Reggae Tribute, Warner/Electra/Asylum, on location in Montego Bay, Jamaica.

In 1984 he recorded his first solo jazz CD, Jazz Vein. The album featured his band: brother Tim Franklin on bass, Barry Sperti on sax, and Paul Parker on drums. It also featured Chuck Leavell from the Rolling Stones and the Allman Brothers Band on keys and Laudir de Oliveira of the band Chicago on percussion. Later that year, he formed an original music group "Lost Weekend" which had regional success and recorded a self-titled album. Lost Weekend became Rockin Robin, a backup band that accompanied national acts around the country.

Wolfman Jack
That same year, in 1984, Franklin met Wolfman Jack and become his bandleader, touring around the country.

In 1986 Franklin relocated to Orlando, Florida, to become Music Director of Little Darlin's Rock n’ Roll Palace. He planned to pay back his friend Wolfman for his years of support by convincing producers to use Wolfman as the host of a new television show, Rock and Roll Palace TV Shows. The show was filmed at Little Darlin's, and in Nashville and Baltimore. Franklin negotiated to change the club name to "Wolfman Jack's Rock and Roll Palace".

He music directed over 180 TV shows, most with Wolfman Jack as the host.

Studio work
In the 1980s, Franklin did session work for The Staple Singers, Middle of the Road, Shut up and Drive and others. He also composed music for Michael Jay and Signature soundtrack libraries. 
 
In the nineties he began producing music for cartoons such as Felix the Cat and Hello Kitty. Working from his own studio, he produced CDs for Tommy Roe, Gloria Gaynor, Spencer Davis, Edgar Winter, Toto's Bobby Kimball and others.
 
In 1992 he traveled to the Isle of Man to produce Classic Tracks for Rick Wakeman of Yes. While mixing in Philadelphia he recorded with Puck and Nat on the Beverly Hills, 90210 soundtrack.

In January 1992 he and the band performed with Bruce Hornsby at the Super Bowl.

In September 1992 he joined the Crickets for the opening of the musical Buddy, with Paul McCartney.

In 1993 he produced Windows of Time for his close friend Patrick Moraz of Yes, The Moody Blues.

Hard Rock
After Wolfman's death in 1995, he became music director of Hard Rock Live in Orlando from 1998 to 2001, performing with classic artists as band leader. Franklin performed alongside Joe Walsh, Bruce Hornsby, Leslie West, Edgar Winter, Melanie Safka, Don Mclean, Rick Derringer, Bobby Kimball and others.

He would also appear on events as keyboard player for Chuck Berry's birthday dates, and the opening of the musical Buddy with Paul McCartney.

Japan, China and Inventions
Franklin has spent a good bit of time living and working in Asia. Starting in 1992, with Rockin Robin, he traveled to Japan several times. In 1998, he composed music for Felix the Cat's Musical Adventure, with Hello Kitty, for Felix the Cat productions. Beginning in 2001, Franklin produced music in China, working with some of the biggest Chinese stars, such as Andy Hui, Lang Lang, A-Mei and others.

He began spending the majority of the year in China, where he began working on entertainment productions and his own electronics design business. After visiting China several times he met another expatriate who created the idea of bringing an American-style Carnival to China who also introduced him to multiple key players in the entertainment and governmental fields. After months of meetings and working with numerous potential stakeholders American International Carnival was born.  The second large scale American carnival company to play to millions of people in Tianjin, Nanning, Taiyuan and Shenyang.

Franklin invented the Volt, a solar charger for iPhone and then iPad, and worked with Optimum Solar to develop "The Plug and Play", a totally self-contained solar power plant, both products selling globally.

Return to the States
Michael Franklin continues to produce from Beijing and Orlando. In 2014, he returned to the United States to resume his music full-time. He open Solar Studios and started the Solar Music label, where has produced many project for the label.  Pat Travers, Randi Paul, Little Anthony, Terry Sylvester of The Hollies, Heather Rice, Fei Peng, Mike Pinera, Blues Image, Larry Coryell and most recently Jon Anderson of Yes and Robby Stienhardt, the original violinist and vocalist of the band Kansas.

Jon Anderson 1000 Hands
Michael recorded arrangements for Jon Anderson of Yes in 1996, though songwriter , Brian Chatton,however the project went dormant for many years. In July 2015, Michael traveled to California to perform at The Bakersfield Music Festival with Iron Butterfly. He contacted Jon to discuss rebooting the project. Michael use some of the original music and transformed that with his orchestration and use on many appearances by artists he believe would make it work. Chick Corea, Ian Anderson, Billy Cobham, Tower of Power, Jean Luc Ponty, Larry Coryell, and many other. This limited release led to highly acclaimed 2019 tour "Jon Anderson 1000 Hands Chapter 1".  The album project was released worldwide by Blue Elan Records, July 31, 2020. Chapter 2 featuring many other artists and new songs set for next year.

Robby Steinhardt Not in Kansas Anymore
Michael ask Kansas violinist Robby Steinhardt to join him on Jon Anderson's 1000 Hands album in 2019. Robby came to Solar Studios, in Orlando and tracked violins on "Activate". During the same session Robby played on one of Michael's original track called "Rise to Grace". This song would be the start of a great friendship and the album called "Not in Kansas Anymore". The project features songs written by Michael Franklin and Tim Franklin with contributions from Robby. Appearances by many guest artist one the project is one of Franklin's trademarks. He enlisted Ian Anderson, Billy Cobham, Pat Travers, Billy Ashbaugh, Steve Morse, Chuck Leavell, Lisa Fischer, Liberty Devitto, Rayford Griffin, Patrick Moraz, Charlie DeChant and many others.  The album project was released worldwide by Solar Music, October 25th,2021. Hundreds of stellar reviews and Nominated by Progreport as, "Album of the Year", "Song of The Year" and "Album Cover of the Year". Rehearsals were underway. A tour was to follow. However, Robby's passing cheated many of his fans of his of hearing the album live. He was very proud of this work! www.solarmusic.com 

Scheduled projects include:
“Sounds”- Michael Winslow, jazz
“Forgotten Secrets" Michael Franklin, solo Piano 
“Anahata”- Michael and Timothy Franklin, jazz 
“Virtual Smorgasbord”-Michael and Timothy Franklin, rock
"Not Titled"- Robby Steinhart set for June 2021.

Discography

References

1952 births
Living people
Record producers from New York (state)